FHM 100 Sexiest Women is an annual listing compiled by the monthly British men's lifestyle magazine FHM, based on which women they believe to be the "sexiest". , each year's list is first announced through a section on FHM official website, FHM.com. The first listing was published in 1995 and was voted for by a panel of 250 judges. The inaugural winner was German supermodel Claudia Schiffer. From 1996 to 2015, the poll was instead voted for by the general public with, at its height, several million votes being cast each year. Subsequent winners have included the British singer Cheryl, the American actress Halle Berry, and Jennifer Lopez. At 36 years old, Berry is the oldest woman ever to top the listing, while Lopez is the first to top the list more than once. By the time FHM ceased publication of its print edition in January 2016, the 100 Sexiest Women list had been compiled 21 times. The most recent holder of the Sexiest Woman title is the Israeli Actress Gal Gadot in 2017.

Alongside the 100 Sexiest Women list, FHM has also twice published a "Most Eligible Bachelorettes" list, in 2006 and 2007, to celebrate qualities such as "talent, star quality and cash". These lists were topped by the American actress Mischa Barton and the American socialite Kimberly Stewart, respectively. To commemorate the 10th and 20th anniversaries of the 100 Sexiest Women list, two one-off charts were compiled in April 2004 and May 2014, to recognise the sexiest women up to those points. The winner of the 2004 list was English singer Louise Redknapp, who had placed on every 100 Sexiest list since 1996, while the 2014 chart topper was singer Rachel Stevens, who had peaked at number two in 2001, 2002 and 2004.

History
The first 100 Sexiest Women list was published in 1995, and was compiled exclusively by a panel of 250 judges. German supermodel Claudia Schiffer topped the inaugural chart. The following year's poll was the first to be opened up to the general public. A total of 10,000 votes were cast, with American actress Gillian Anderson being announced as the winner in September. A spokesman for FHM described her as the "thinking man's crumpet" and a "surprise winner". Anderson had posed half-naked on the front cover of the magazine earlier that year.

Over subsequent years, the list's popularity continued to grow. The 1998 poll was voted on by half a million readers, with its companion issue being sold sealed inside a plastic cover. Martin Daubney, a former features editor of FHM, noted that it added a "sense of mystique and occasion" to the issue, which went on to sell 936,000 copies. The issue's cover girl was British TV presenter Cat Deeley, who had placed at number seven; the 100 Sexiest winner was Playboy model Jenny McCarthy. The following year, FHM publicists promoted the poll by projecting a 60 ft naked image of British TV presenter Gail Porter onto the front of the Palace of Westminster. A FHM spokesman remarked: "We want to up the voting frenzy for the poll ... It is a cheeky way of increasing interest." Porter was placed at number eight in the chart that year, while American actress Sarah Michelle Gellar was number one. 

The first person to top the 100 Sexiest Women list more than once was American singer Jennifer Lopez, who placed at number one in both 2000 and 2001. Speaking about being named the sexiest woman in the world for a second year running, Lopez said that she was "overwhelmed" and added: "Any woman who says they don't like being called sexy, they're lying." By 2002, the list was attracting over five million votes – that year, Russian tennis player Anna Kournikova was number one. A further five million votes were cast the following year, when American actress Halle Berry was named as the world's sexiest. At 36 years old, Berry was the oldest woman to top the list. She responded: "Wow, that's a pretty heady title. I'm not so sure I live up to it, but thank you anyway." The first British woman to top the listing was the model Kelly Brook, who was named the world's sexiest in 2005, the most successful poll to that point. , Brook has been featured in the top ten of FHM 100 Sexiest Women ten times, which is more than any other entrant. 

The 2011 list was noted for being the first to include a transgender woman. The androgynous model Andrej Pejić was voted at number 98 on the poll. FHM caused controversy when the entry's accompanying blurb warned its readers to "pass the sick bucket" and described Pejic as a "thing". Following a backlash, FHM removed the text from their website, spoke directly with Pejić and issued a public apology, saying that the online entry "wasn't subbed prior to going live". The final 100 Sexiest Women poll to be voted for by the public was published in 2015, before FHM went out of print in January the following year. The list included its oldest entrant ever, 80-year-old food writer Mary Berry, who was placed at number 74, while the sexiest woman that year was British actress Michelle Keegan. Speaking in November 2015 as FHM suspended its print publication, a spokesman reflected that the poll was what the magazine was best known for, and that it had "helped propel the careers of many well-known actresses, musicians and models". Subsequent 100 Sexiest Women lists have been compiled by FHM writers themselves, and have been published on FHM.com. , the most recent winner is Gal Gadot.

100 Sexiest Women winners

Most Eligible Bachelorettes
Alongside the 100 Sexiest Women list, FHM also twice published a "Most Eligible Bachelorettes" list, which compiled women based on their "eligibility" and was voted for by the magazine's readership. Unlike the 100 Sexiest Women list, this list also considered qualities such as "talent, star quality and cash" as well as sex appeal in its compilation. Similar lists published by the US version of FHM had been topped by women such as model Lauren Bush and socialite Paris Hilton. 

The 2006 list was voted for by more than 3,000 FHM readers, and was published in March of that year. It was topped by American actress Mischa Barton. Speaking about the result, FHM editor Ross Brown remarked: "Our most eligible list consists of much more than just sex appeal and our readers recognise a good catch when they see one." The following year, the Most Eligible Bachelorettes list was topped by American socialite Kimberly Stewart. The list received over 10,000 votes from FHM readership, and was featured in the April 2007 issue of the magazine. An FHM spokesperson stated: "Kimberly Stewart has all the attributes you want in a woman. She's rich, gorgeous, likes to party and she's the daughter of a legend."

Anniversary lists
On two occasions, FHM has produced special lists to mark anniversaries of the 100 Sexiest Women chart. To commemorate the tenth edition of the poll in May 2004, FHM published a list ranking the 50 sexiest women of the previous ten years. The list was topped by the English singer Louise Redknapp, who had placed on every 100 Sexiest list since 1996. Ten years later, in May 2014, FHM published a list of the "Sexiest Women of All Time", compiled using a new analysis based on the previous 20 years' worth of polls. The winner was the English singer Rachel Stevens. Stevens had been featured on 11 lists at that point, but had never been placed first on any of the annual lists, instead peaking at number two in 2001, 2002 and 2004. On learning the result, she remarked: "To win this award feels absolutely amazing. ... It's brilliant."

Notes

References

External links
 

1995 establishments in the United Kingdom
2016 disestablishments in the United Kingdom
Annual events in the United Kingdom
Lists of women
Physical attractiveness